Intradialytic parenteral nutrition (IDPN) is a nutritional support therapy (medical nutrition therapy) for people on hemodialysis who have a difficult time maintaining adequate nutrition. It is administered directly into the bloodstream of patients with chronic kidney disease (CKD) in an effort to decrease the associated morbidity and mortality experienced in patients with kidney failure. IDPN contains protein (amino acids), carbohydrates (dextrose), and fats (lipids) in an attempt to meet a patient's weekly nutritional needs. Solutions can be individualized for each patient based on weight, needs, medical history and enteral intake.

History
Prior to 1990, traditional therapies for dialysis patients, such as liberalized diet and oral supplements, led to protein and/or calorie malnutrition.

Efforts to supplement nutritional intake by providing nutrients during the dialysis procedure were attempted. As a result, IDPN became an established therapy to replete malnourished CKD-5 dialysis patients in the early 1990s. Generally the patients received a set formulation containing standard amounts of dextrose, amino acids and lipids regardless of the patient's weight, dialysis time, and complicating co-morbid conditions.

New approach to IDPN therapy
To address specific nutritional needs of individual patients, several providers of IDPN therapy developed formulations that take clinical variables into account in order to best fit the patient's individual needs and condition. Specific formulations address distinct differences between nutritional needs of those patients who exhibit protein malnutrition and those patients who exhibit calorie malnutrition.

See also
 Nutrition
 Clinical nutrition

References

Nephrology
Nutrition